"The Most Beautifullest Thing in This World" is the first single released from Keith Murray's  debut album of the same name. The song was produced by Erick Sermon, who also provided background vocals.

Single track listing
"The Most Beautifullest Thing in This World" (LP Version)- 3:47  
"The Most Beautifullest Thing in This World" (Green-Eyed Remix)- 3:47  
"The Most Beautifullest Thing in This World" (Sax Remix)- 3:48  
"Herb is Pumpin'"- 2:28

Chart performance
The song was Murray's most successful single to date, peaking at No. 50 on the Billboard Hot 100 and number three on the Hot Rap Singles chart.

Charts

Weekly charts

Year-end charts

Samples used
The Keith Murray single used a samples of the 1983 hit record "Between the Sheets" originally performed by The Isley Brothers,  "Bootsy Gets Live" by Bootsy Collins, and "Slow Down" by Brand Nubian.

Sampled by other artists
Rapper Jay-Z sampled the song for his single, "Glory".

References

1994 debut singles
Keith Murray (rapper) songs
Song recordings produced by Erick Sermon
1993 songs
Jive Records singles
Songs written by Ronald Isley
Songs written by O'Kelly Isley Jr.
Songs written by Rudolph Isley
Songs written by Chris Jasper
Songs written by Ernie Isley
Songs written by Marvin Isley